Aishwarya Khare is an Indian television actress, who works in Hindi serials. She is best known for her role as Mahima Srinivasan in Yeh Hai Chahatein and Lakshmi Bajwa in Bhagya Lakshmi.

Early life
Aishwarya Khare hails from Bhopal, Madhya Pradesh. She is a beauty pageant winner and a theatre artiste.

Career
Khare made her acting debut in 2014 through the director Lal Vijay Shahdev's drama series Yeh Shaadi Hai Ya Sauda on DD National. The series ran for more than 300 episodes.

In 2016, Khare played the parallel lead in drama series Jaane Kya Hoga Rama Re which aired on Life OK. In 2016, she played the role of Aparajita in Zee TV’s supernatural drama series Vishkanya Ek Anokhi Prem Kahani.

She then went on to play the role of a police officer in Beta Bhagya Se Bitiya Saubhagya Se aired in Doordarshan. Later on, she played the lead in political drama Saam Daam Dand Bhed as Bulbul Namdhari, Vijay's wife and love interest.

In 2019, she was roped in by Ekta Kapoor for cameo in her drama series Yeh Hai Chahatein on StarPlus where she played the role of Mahima Srinivasan, sister of the protagonist, later on her role turned into an antagonist. It was her first noticeable role on Indian television and her performance as an antagonist was appreciated by audience. In 2020, she was cast as Meera Sharma, Bani's adoptive sister in Naagin 5.

Since 2021, Khare is portraying the role of protagonist Lakshmi Oberoi in Ekta Kapoor's drama series Bhagya Lakshmi on Zee TV. It was her third collaboration with Balaji Telefilms as well as her third consecutive top rated Hindi GEC show as well as her first major success as a lead actress.

Filmography

Television

Special appearances

References

External links 
 
 

Living people
Indian television actresses
Indian soap opera actresses
Actresses from Madhya Pradesh
Actresses in Hindi television
21st-century Indian actresses
Female models from Madhya Pradesh
Year of birth missing (living people)